The Félix U. Gómez Station is a station on Lines 1 and 3 of the Monterrey Metro. It is located in the intersection of Felix U. Gómez Avenue and Colon Avenue in Monterrey Centre. The station was opened on 25 April 1991 as part of the inaugural section of Line 1, going from San Bernabé to Exposición.

This station serves the northeast side of the downtown area and also the Terminal neighborhood (Colonia Terminal). It is accessible for people with disabilities.

This station is named after the Felix U. Gómez Avenue, and its logo represents a cannon, since Felix U. Gómez was a Mexican Military General and revolutionary.

This station also connects with the "MetroBus" system.

References

Metrorrey stations
Railway stations opened in 1991
1991 establishments in Mexico